Dog Creek is a stream in Miller County in the U.S. state of Missouri. It is a tributary of the Osage River.

Tradition states a man was bitten by a dog near Dog Creek, causing its name to be selected.

See also
List of rivers of Missouri

References

Rivers of Miller County, Missouri
Rivers of Missouri